Caconemobius is a genus of crickets in the subfamily Nemobiinae. There are about 15 species distributed from the Pacific coasts of Asia to Hawaii, where they occur in marine environments on the shores of the Pacific Ocean.

These are wingless crickets that do not sing. They have bulbous abdomens. They live among rocks on beaches and other marine environments, where they may swim and dive in the saline waters.

Taxonomy
The Orthoptera Species File database lists the following species:
Caconemobius akusekiensis (Oshiro, 1990)
Caconemobius albus Otte, 1994
Caconemobius anahulu Otte, 1994
Caconemobius daitoensis (Oshiro, 1986)
Caconemobius dibrachiatus Ma & Zhang, 2015
Caconemobius fori ('ūhini nēnē pele, or lava cricket) Gurney & Rentz, 1978 
Caconemobius howarthi Gurney & Rentz, 1978
Caconemobius nihoensis Otte, 1994
Caconemobius paralbus Otte, 1994
Caconemobius sandwichensis Otte, 1994
Caconemobius sazanami (Furukawa, 1970)
Caconemobius schauinslandi (Alfken, 1901)
Caconemobius takarai (Oshiro, 1990)
Caconemobius uuku Otte, 1994
Caconemobius varius Gurney & Rentz, 1978

References

Trigonidiidae
Taxonomy articles created by Polbot